The sternalis muscle is an anatomical variation that lies in front of the sternal end of the pectoralis major parallel to the margin of the sternum. The sternalis muscle may be a variation of the pectoralis major or of the rectus abdominis.

Structure 
The sternalis is a muscle that runs along the anterior aspect of the body of the sternum. It lies superficially and parallel to the sternum. Its origin and insertion are variable. The sternalis muscle often originates from the upper part of the sternum and can display varying insertions such as the pectoral fascia, lower ribs, costal cartilages, rectus sheath, aponeurosis of the abdominal external oblique muscle. There is still a great deal of disagreement about its innervation and its embryonic origin.

In a review, it was reported that the muscle was innervated by the external or internal thoracic nerves in 55% of the cases, by the intercostal nerves in 43% of the cases, while the remaining cases were supplied by both nerves. However, innervation by the pectoral nerves has also been reported. This appears to indicate that the sternalis is not always derived from the same embryonic origin.

Prevalence 

Cadaveric studies showed that the sternalis muscle has a mean prevalence of around 7.8% in the population with the range from 0.5% to 23.5%. It has a slightly higher incidence in females. Though, It was proposed that a possible reason for the high prevalence may result from the existence of small, ill-defined or tendinous fibres, which could be misidentified for a sternalis muscle.

Variations 

A 2014 study classified the sternalis into three types depending on morphology.
 Type I (single head and single belly)
 Type II (double-headed/multi-headed) 
 Type III (double-bellied/multi-bellied)
Type I, the single head and single belly was seen in the majority of reported cases (58.5%), type II in 18.1%, and type III in 23.4%.

In addition to the above classification, triple-bellied/double-headed sternalis has also been reported.

Function 
There is no apparent physiological function of the sternalis muscle. However, there are many theories for a function. It may function as a proprioceptive sensor for thoracic wall movements. It may also take part in the movement of the shoulder joint or have an additional role in elevation of the chest wall.

Clinical significance 

The presence of the sternalis is asymptomatic but aesthetic complaints have been reported as it was reported to cause chest asymmetry or deviation of the nipple-areola complex. The presence of the sternalis may cause alterations in the electrocardiogram or confusion in mammography. However, there is a potential benefit of the muscle as it can be used as a flap in a reconstructive surgery of the head and neck and the anterior chest wall.

History 
The sternalis was first reported by Carbolius in 1604 and the name was first given by Turner in 1867. Different terminologies have been given to the sternalis due to its highly varied morphology and the disagreement on its embryonic origin. The sternalis was referred to as the rectus sternalis, sternalis brutorum, musculus sternalis, episternalis, parasternalis, presternalis, rectus sterni, rectus thoracis, rectus thoracicus superficialis, superficial rectus abdominis, japonicas, and thoracicus depending on studies.

Additional images

References

 
Accessory muscle